Wilfrid Arthur Greene, 1st Baron Greene,  (30 December 1883 – 16 April 1952) was a British lawyer and judge, noted for creating two crucial principles of administrative law, the Wednesbury doctrine and the Carltona doctrine.

Early life, education and military service
Greene was born in Beckenham, Kent, son of Arthur Werguelin Greene, a solicitor, and his wife Katherine Agnes Fooke. He was educated at Westminster School; he was one of the first Roman Catholic pupils to be admitted to the School. He graduated from Christ Church, Oxford in 1906 with a BA; he had the reputation of being "a formidable scholar". He was admitted to Inner Temple in 1908 entitled to practice as a Barrister-at-Law. He graduated from Christ Church, Oxford in 1912 with an Oxbridge MA. He gained the rank of captain in the service of the 2/1st Battalion, Oxfordshire and Buckinghamshire Light Infantry. He fought in the First World War between 1914 and 1918. He was decorated with the award of the MC in 1918. He was decorated with the award of Cavaliere, Order of the Crown of Italy. He was decorated with the award of Croix de Guerre. He was invested with an OBE in 1919.

Legal and judicial career
Greene was a Lord Justice of Appeal from 1935 to 1937. He served as Master of the Rolls between 1937 and 1949, and subsequently became a Law Lord. On 16 July 1941, he was raised to the peerage as Baron Greene, of Holmbury St Mary in the County of Surrey. The title became extinct on his death in April 1952, aged 68. He married Nancy Wright in 1909.

Greene in his time was the acknowledged master of administrative law – indeed it is impossible to exaggerate his contribution to the development of this field of law. Despite some refinements, the Wednesbury doctrine of reasonableness remains the benchmark by which courts review decisions of public bodies. Of even greater significance was his enunciation of the Carltona doctrine in Carltona Ltd. v. Commissioners of Public Works [1943] 2 All E.R. 560 that "the duties imposed upon Ministers and the powers given to Ministers are normally exercised under the authority of the Minister by responsible officials of the Department". It may fairly be said that the Carltona doctrine is the legal underpinning for the operation of the civil service in the United Kingdom and Ireland.

In 1941 he chaired a Board of Inquiry into pay in the mining industry, prompted by a series of strikes, and at the urging of Harold Wilson (the future Prime Minister, then serving as a wartime civil servant), who served as secretary to the inquiry, recommended both a pay rise and the establishment of a minimum wage for the industry. Greene, who was not normally thought of as a "political" judge, is said to have remarked cheerfully that his report was the first step towards nationalisation of the coal mines.

Joldwynds
Greene acquired Joldwynds, a country house in Holmbury St Mary designed by Arts and Crafts architect Philip Webb, but demolished it in 1930. He commissioned Oliver Hill to design a new Joldwynds in modernist style, completed in 1932. He also commissioned a house to a design by the modernist Tecton Group, which was built in the grounds of Joldwynds in 1939.

Honours
Military Cross in 1918.
OBE in 1919.
KC in 1922.
Cavaliere, Order of the Crown of Italy
Croix de Guerre
Knight Bachelor in 1935.
Privy Councillor in 1935.
Raised to the Peerage in 1941

Cases
Associated Provincial Picture Houses v Wednesbury Corporation [1948] 1 KB 223
Re Smith & Fawcett [1942] Ch. 304
 Carltona v Commissioners of Public Works [1943] 2 All. E.R. 580

Notes

References

Jeremy Lever, ‘Greene, Wilfrid Arthur, Baron Greene (1883–1952)’, Oxford Dictionary of National Biography, Oxford University Press, 2004

1883 births
1952 deaths
20th-century English judges
Law lords
English King's Counsel
Alumni of Christ Church, Oxford
Members of the Privy Council of the United Kingdom
Masters of the Rolls
Members of the Judicial Committee of the Privy Council
British Army personnel of World War I
Recipients of the Military Cross
Officers of the Order of the British Empire
Knights Bachelor
Recipients of the Croix de Guerre 1914–1918 (France)
Barons created by George VI
People from Beckenham